List of Pennsylvania Dutch language poets. This is a list of poets who write, or wrote, in Pennsylvania Dutch.

M
Henry Meyer

Z
Calvin Ziegler

Pennsylvania Dutch language